Otlu Qaya— a cliff, situated in the southeast of Crimea in a valley between Koktebel and Otuzy, north of Kara Dag Mountain. The height of the cliff is 263 meters above sea level. Rock name was coined from Crimean Tatar and can be translate as "grassy" or "fire rock". The rock has a through hole. Once upon a time, stones were scattered on the mountain slope that reminded a grazing flock of sheep, that stones were used in building the highway, but locals still call this area a "petrified herd". A lot of folk legends are associated with this rock, according to one of them, a young shepherd, grazing sheep on a rock, once noticed a half-naked girl and, “having forgotten the duty of hospitality, rushed to her with an unkind thought”, was immediately dumbfounded, and with him everything herd.

See also 

 Aq Qaya
 Topraq Qaya
 Otuz Qaya

Sources and bibliography 

Sources

Bibliography
 Севостьянов, Александр. Крымские легенды и сказания. — Симферополь, 2014. — Т. 1. — 514 с.
 Кеппен, Пётр. Указатель к картѣ Южнаго Крыма: принадлежащей к Крымскому сборнику Петра Кеппена / М. С. Воронцов. — СПб.: Императорская Академия Наук, 1836. — Т. 1.
 Annals. Annals. — СПб.: Ленинградский государственный университет, 1938.

Crimean Mountains
Tourist attractions in Crimea